The pool stage of the 1997–98 European Challenge Cup.

Pool 1

Pool 2

Pool 3

Pool 4

Pool 5

Pool 6

Pool 7

Pool 8

Qualifiers

See also
European Challenge Cup
1997–98 Heineken Cup

References

pool stage
1997-98